The Hero Maestro is a scooter from Hero Motocorp. It comes as the second scooter from what was traditionally a motorcycle company. The scooter was unveiled at The O2 Arena in London along with Hero's new corporate identity in 2011, and was launched in the market in 2012. Later, Hero Motocorp started to upgrade the vehicle and started releasing it as Hero Maestro Edge and Hero Maestro Edge 125.

Market positioning
In terms of positioning, the Maestro is pitted against the Hero Pleasure, Hero's first offering in the scooter segment. Describing itself as a boy's scooter, it is marketed as a vehicle for young riders that captures all the little quirks that define boys. Aptly bearing the tagline of "It's a boy thing", the Maestro caters to the male section of a gender polarized scooter market.

Sales
Hero's sales momentum amid the slowdown is being propped up in no small terms by its two scooter brands. Maestro has been able to crank up volumes to the tune of 28,000 units per month in a year's time. The Pleasure which brought in the tagline of 'Why should boys have all the fun' grosses sales of 30,000 units a month and is a mainstay for Hero.

Engine
The Maestro is powered by a  engine, and has a dry clutch with variomatic drive.

References

External links
 Hero MotoCorp New Two Wheelers, Motorcycles, Two Wheelers in India

Motor scooters
Motorcycles introduced in 2012